Genesis (Tyler Dayspring) is a fictional character appearing in American comic books published by Marvel Comics. He is a mutant and the foe of Cable and Wolverine. He first appeared in a flashback in X-Force #1 (1991). His first appearance as "Mister Tolliver" is in X-Force #5 (1992) and his first appearance as Genesis was in Cable #19. 

Some sources state that he is actually Cable's son, while others state that he is Cable's 'nephew' since his father was Stryfe.

Fictional character biography
Tyler Dayspring was born two thousand years in the future as the son of Nathan Summers and his wife Aliya Summers (though some accounts claim that Nathan was not the actual father and has adopted Tyler). He was raised by the Summers as part of the Askani Clan Chosen. As a young teenager, Tyler was abducted by the villain Stryfe and corrupted. He reappeared as one of Stryfe's soldiers and took Dawnsilk, a friend of Nathan, as a hostage. Seeing no other solution, Nathan shot Tyler, freeing Dawnsilk (though she received brain damage from the mental link between her and Tyler). Tyler was thought to be dead, but he survived and escaped from Stryfe's service. He had grown bitter against his father for shooting him.

He used time travel to come to the present, following his father. He created the identity of "Tolliver", an illegal weapons merchant who always appeared wearing a rubber mask. "Mister Tolliver" was initially an unseen character, as his face (actually his mask) was never fully shown. Tyler wanted to punish everybody who had ever hurt him, first and foremost his father, who was now calling himself Cable. He hired the Six Pack, his father's group of mercenaries, and sent them on a mission that would bring them into conflict with Stryfe, who had also traveled back in time. This mission would result in the Six Pack disbanding and most of the members hating Cable afterwards.

After the Six Pack disbanded, Cable became part of New Mutants, turning them into X-Force. During this time, Cable told Cannonball about Tyler, but said he was just a friend who had joined Stryfe's Mutant Liberation Front and was killed on a mission. Tolliver hired the mercenary Deadpool and his girlfriend Copycat to kidnap Domino. Copycat took Domino's place and infiltrated X-force, but she was later found out and Cable freed Domino. In the fight, Tolliver's helicopter exploded and many assumed that Tolliver had died.

Various mercenaries began looking for Tolliver's legacy, known only as the ultimate weapon. It turned out to be the futuristic android Zero. After the X-Cutioner's Song, Stryfe's body was destroyed and Cable returned from the future. Cable told X-Force the truth about Tyler being his son. He also found out from the cyborg Sinsear that Tolliver had been another time-traveler, known simply as "the Other", who had come from the same future. Tyler, now working with Zero, used his mutant powers to discover the truth about the exact relationship between Cable and Stryfe. He revealed this knowledge to Cable, who was possessed by Stryfe's spirit. The truth that Stryfe was a clone of Cable, was too much for Stryfe to bear and Cable was released, while Stryfe's spirit died. Tyler disappeared with Zero, but Zero left him shortly afterward.

Under his "Genesis" identity, Tyler considered himself the new heir of Apocalypse and chose Wolverine to turn him into a Horseman of Apocalypse. He attempted to erase Wolverine's mind and re-bond adamantium to Wolverine's skeleton. On both accounts he failed; Wolverine's mutation was sent into overdrive and he reverted into a feral state. Wolverine killed Genesis.

During a near-death experience, Cable met the spirit of his son, who told him that he had found peace in the afterlife, but this may have been a hallucination on Cable's part. It is revealed that the Sports Arena on Cable's Providence Island is named "The Tyler Dayspring Stadium" after him.

Powers and abilities
Tyler Dayspring was a mutant with the ability to form a psionic link with another consciousness and visually project those memories as solid holograms. As Genesis, he absorbed the energy of many mutants to increase his power, but he never displayed any increased mutant powers afterwards; instead, somewhat like his father, he relied on powered armour and advanced weaponry. His first appearance, drawn by Rob Liefeld, has Tyler has dark hair, but all his later appearances have Tyler as blond.

Reception
 In 2018, CBR.com ranked Genesis 2nd in their "8 X-Men Kids Cooler Than Their Parents (And 7 Who Are Way Worse)" list.

In other media
 An action figure of Genesis was produced by Toy Biz as part of the merged X-Men/X-Force line. He was packaged with a miniature version of Spyne.
 Tyler Dayspring appeared in the animated X-Men series. This version was depicted as Cable's young son, and fellow Clan Chosen member as an adult, and helps his father in obtaining a time machine, which would help stop Apocalypse. Tyler appeared in the multi-part episodes "Time Fugitives" and "Beyond Good and Evil".
 Genesis is a playing piece in the Heroclix game system. He gains the Horsemen of Apocalypse keyword, and is played at 114pts.

References

Characters created by Fabian Nicieza
Characters created by Rob Liefeld
Comics characters introduced in 1992
Holography in fiction
Marvel Comics mutants
Marvel Comics supervillains
Marvel Comics telepaths